Jan Wenzel Schmidt (born 8 October 1991) is a German politician for the AfD and since 2021 member of the Bundestag, the federal diet.

Life and politics 

Schmidt was born 1991 in Magdeburg and became member of the Bundestag in 2021.

References 

Living people
1991 births
People from Magdeburg
Members of the Bundestag 2021–2025
21st-century German politicians